Luigetiik is a pond in Tallinn, the capital city of Estonia. It is situated inside Kadriorg Park, close to the Kadriorg Palace.

External links 

Ponds of Europe
Bodies of water of Estonia
Landforms of Tallinn